Aspidoras is a genus of catfishes of the family Callichthyidae from Brazil.

Taxonomy
The type species for this genus is Aspidoras rochai. The name Aspidoras is derived from the Greek aspis (shield) and dora (skin).

Aspidoras is easily distinguished from the other genera of the subfamily Corydoradinae by the presence of a supraoccipital fontanel; this character is an autapomorphy for the genus. Many of the species of Aspidoras are similar and often hard to distinguish. Without specimens, it is often very difficult to positively identify a species from photographs alone. They are all small species. A. taurus is exceptional in that it just surpasses 5 cm in length.

The monophyly of the genus has been demonstrated.

Species
There are currently 18 recognized species in this genus:

 Aspidoras albater Nijssen & Isbrücker, 1976 (False macropterus)
 Aspidoras aldebaran Tencatt, M. R. Britto, Isbrücker & Pavanelli, 2022
 Aspidoras azaghal Tencatt, Muriel-Cunha, Zuanon, Ferreira & Britto, 2020
 Aspidoras belenos M. R. Britto, 1998
 Aspidoras brunneus Nijssen & Isbrücker, 1976
 Aspidoras carvalhoi Nijssen & Isbrücker, 1976
 Aspidoras depinnai M. R. Britto, 2000
 Aspidoras fuscoguttatus Nijssen & Isbrücker, 1976
 Aspidoras gabrieli Wosiacki, T. G. Pereira & R. E. dos Reis, 2014 
 Aspidoras kiriri Oliveira, Zanata, Tencatt & M. R. Britto
 Aspidoras lakoi P. Miranda-Ribeiro, 1949
 Aspidoras maculosus Nijssen & Isbrücker, 1976
 Aspidoras mephisto Tencatt & Bichuette, 2017
 Aspidoras poecilus Nijssen & Isbrücker, 1976
 Aspidoras psammatides M. R. Britto, F. C. T. Lima & A. C. A. Santos, 2005
 Aspidoras raimundi Nijssen & Isbrücker, 1976
 Aspidoras rochai R. Ihering, 1907
 Aspidoras velites M. R. Britto, F. C. T. Lima & C. L. R. Moreira, 2002

Distribution
Aspidoras species are endemic to small and shallow streams draining the Brazilian Shield. The species of Aspidoras are distributed in eastern and central Brazil. Most species are narrowly endemic, occurring in restricted areas of some major river drainages: A. fuscoguttatus and A. lakoi from the Paraná River system. A. albater, A. eurycephalus and A. gabrieli from the Tocantins River system. A. brunneus, A. marianae and A. microgalaeus from the Xingu River system. A. belenos, A. pauciradiatus and A. velites from Araguaia River system. A. rochai from rivers around Fortaleza. A. raimundi from the Parnaíba River. A. carvalhoi from rivers around Guaramiranga, Ceará State. A. maculosus from the Itapicuru River. A. menezesi from the Jaguaribe River. A. spilotus from the Acaráu River. A. poecilus from the Xingu River, Araguaia River, and Tocantins River systems. A. psammatides from the Paraguaçu River. A. virgulatus from the coastal rivers in Espírito Santo. A. depinnai is from the Ipojuca River basin, Pernambuco State. A. taurus is known from the upper Itiquira River and upper Taquari River, both tributaries of the Paraguay River, Mato Grosso State, Brazil.

In the aquarium
Aspidoras do fairly well in aquaria under similar conditions as for most Corydoras species.  The water conditions that seem best are a pH of 6.8 to 7.0 and a temperature of about 22 °C to 26 °C.  The species that is most likely to be found in an aquarium is the sixray corydoras, Aspidoras pauciradiatus.

References

Callichthyidae
Taxa named by Rodolpho von Ihering
Fish of South America
Catfish genera
Freshwater fish genera